This is a list of professional wrestling websites. Online websites who focus mostly or exclusively on professional wrestling.

News websites

Historical websites

Sales websites

Comedy websites

See also
 Dirt sheet
 List of professional wrestling magazines
 List of professional wrestling streaming services

References

Professional wrestling
 
websites